Estar sin ti (English: To be without you) is the 11th studio album by the Mexican singer Mijares. This album was released on 4 November 1997 and it was produced by Jorge Avendaño Lührs and Gerardo Flores. This new material was praised by fans, but EMI International didn't give promotion at all, since this album was the last disc of Mijares with them, fans criticized this action from the company inasmuch as the discs passed almost unnoticed.

Track listing
Tracks[]:
 Estar sin ti
 Somos dos
 Yo te quiero
 A la mitad de la cama
 Para no olvidarte
 Loco por verte
 Saldo negativo
 Necesitas creer
 Amándonos
 Estás enamorada

1997 albums
Manuel Mijares albums